The New Juabeng North constituency is in the Eastern region of Ghana. The member of Parliament elected at the 2020 election is Kwasi Boateng Adjei. He was elected on the ticket of the New Patriotic Party (NPP) and  won a majority of 21,151 representing 64.89% of total votes to win the constituency election to become the MP. He had earlier represented the constituency in the 7th Republican parliament.

See also
List of Ghana Parliament constituencies

References

Parliamentary constituencies in the Eastern Region (Ghana)